The 1897 Minnesota Golden Gophers football team represented the University of Minnesota in the 1897 Western Conference football season. 
The 1897 season was the second and final season under head coach Alexander Jerrems. The season started out well, but the team lost its last four games including all three of its conference games. The Ariel reported that there was a general opinion that the team's difficulties were the result of poor management. Jerrems was not asked to return and changes were made to the rules governing athletics at the university—managers would no longer be chosen by the students.

Schedule

Roster
 Ends, Jack Harrison (captain and left end), C.R. Shipley (right end)
 Tackles, George A.E. Finlayson (left tackle), Claude Nicoulin (right tackle)
 Guard, A.M. Smith (left guard), A.K. Ingalls (right guard)
 Center, J.C. Winkjer
 Quarterback, George E. Cole
 Halfbacks, G.W. Evans (left half), S.W. Bagley (right half)
 Fullback, Harry C. Loomis
 Trainer, Edward "Dad" Moulton
 Coach, Alexander Jerrems.

References

Minnesota
Minnesota Golden Gophers football seasons
Minnesota Golden Gophers football